Kaldrananeshreppur is a municipality in Iceland.

References

Municipalities of Iceland
Westfjords